Nicolás Garayalde (born 21 July 1999) is an Argentine professional footballer who plays as a midfielder for Vélez Sarsfield.

Career
Garayalde is a product of the Vélez Sarsfield academy. His breakthrough into first-team football arrived in late-2020 under manager Mauricio Pellegrino, with his senior debut occurring on 1 December during a Copa Sudamericana round of sixteen encounter with Categoría Primera A team Deportivo Cali; he replaced Federico Mancuello with ten minutes left of a 5–1 second leg victory in Colombia.

Career statistics
.

Notes

References

External links

1999 births
Living people
Place of birth missing (living people)
Argentine footballers
Association football midfielders
Club Atlético Vélez Sarsfield footballers